Jaccob Scott Slavin (born May 1, 1994) is an American professional ice hockey defenseman and alternate captain for the Carolina Hurricanes of the National Hockey League (NHL). Slavin was selected by the Hurricanes in the fourth round, 120th overall, of the 2012 NHL Entry Draft.

Playing career
As a youth, Slavin played in the 2007 Quebec International Pee-Wee Hockey Tournament with the Colorado Thunderbirds minor ice hockey team.

Slavin was drafted by the Carolina Hurricanes in the fourth round, 120th overall, of the 2012 NHL Entry Draft. Despite being drafted, Slavin committed to Colorado College to play for the NCAA Division I Tigers ice hockey team. In his first year, his outstanding play was recognized when he was selected as NCHC Rookie of the Year and named to both the 2013–14 NCHC All-Rookie Team and the 2013–14 NCHC All-Conference Second Team.

The following season, Slavin was named to the 2014–15 NCHC All-Conference First Team. Following his sophomore year, Slavin signed a three-year, entry-level contract with the Carolina Hurricanes, forgoing his collegiate career.

Slavin made his professional debut to start the 2015–16 season with the Hurricanes' American Hockey League (AHL) affiliate, the Charlotte Checkers. With 7 assists in his first 14 games with the Checkers, Slavin was recalled by the Hurricanes and made his NHL debut on November 20, 2015. Slavin scored his first NHL hat-trick on March 13, 2017, away against the New York Islanders.

On July 12, 2017, the Hurricanes signed Slavin to a seven-year, $37.1 million contract worth $5.3 million annually. The contract began in the 2018–19 season.

On August 1, 2020, Slavin scored his first career playoff goal against the New York Rangers. He became the first player to score a goal in an NHL game in the month of August.

On June 19, 2021, he was awarded the Lady Byng Memorial Trophy.

Personal life
Slavin grew up in Erie, Colorado, with four other siblings—Justin, Josiah, Jeremiah and Jordan—all of whom were also active athletes. Slavin and his wife Kylie are strong Christians. The couple has two children: a daughter, who was adopted during the 2019 Stanley Cup playoffs, and son who was born in July 2022.

Career statistics

Regular season and playoffs

International

Awards and honors

References

External links 

1994 births
Living people
American men's ice hockey defensemen
Carolina Hurricanes draft picks
Carolina Hurricanes players
Charlotte Checkers (2010–) players
Chicago Steel players
Colorado College Tigers men's ice hockey players
Lady Byng Memorial Trophy winners
People from Erie, Colorado
Ice hockey players from Colorado
American Christians